Rugby union in South Africa is centrally administered by the South African Rugby Union, which consists of fourteen provincial unions – the Blue Bulls Rugby Union, the Boland Rugby Union, the Border Rugby Football Union, the Eastern Province Rugby Union, the Free State Rugby Union, the Golden Lions Rugby Union, the Griffons Rugby Union, the Griqualand West Rugby Union, the KwaZulu-Natal Rugby Union, the Leopards Rugby Union, the Mpumalanga Rugby Union, the South Western Districts Rugby Football Union, the Valke Rugby Union and the Western Province Rugby Football Union.

Each of these unions administers a senior professional rugby team that participates in the domestic Currie Cup and Rugby Challenge (previously Vodacom Cup) competitions. In addition, these unions are responsible for amateur club rugby in their region. Clubs participate in provincial leagues organised by the unions; university sides also participate in the annual Varsity Cup competition, while non-university sides participate in the annual Gold Cup.

Franchises

The eight franchises – teams that will participate in professional international competitions – and their constituent rugby unions are:

Provincial Rugby

The fourteen provincial unions each have a professional team that play in the annual Currie Cup and Rugby Challenge (previously Vodacom Cup) competitions, plus youth sides in the Under-21 and Under-19 provincial competitions and youth tournaments such as the Under-18 and Under-13 Craven Week tournaments, the Under-18 Academy Week tournament and the Under-16 Grant Khomo Week tournament.

Since 2013, a  team participated in the Vodacom Cup competition. Limpopo is a sub-union that forms part of the Blue Bulls Rugby Union.

Varsity Rugby

In 2008, a Varsity Cup competition was created, with eight universities competing. In 2011, a second tier called the Varsity Shield was added, consisting of a further five side and the collective was rebranded as "Varsity Rugby". In addition to playing in the Varsity Rugby competitions, these sides also take part in the provincial unions' championships.

Provincial championships

Each of the provincial unions have a number of amateur clubs playing in the respective club championships. The highest-placed non-university sides qualify to the annual Gold Cup.

Blue Bulls Rugby Union

The club sides that form part of the Blue Bulls Rugby Union are:

 Atteridgeville
 Brits
 Bronkhorstspruit
 Centurion
 Correctional Services
 Cullinan
 Dragons
 Eersterust
 Hartbeespoort
 Mabopane
 Mamelodi
 Nellmapius
 Medunsa Campus
 Naka Bulls
 Noordelikes
 Oostelike Eagles
 Pretoria
 Pretoria Military
 QBR
 Silver Valke
 Soshanguve
 Transwerk Parke
 Tswaing
 Tuine
 
 
 Westelikes

Blue Bulls Limpopo Sub-Union

The club sides that form part of the Blue Bulls Limpopo Sub-Union are:

 Atok
 Bosveld
 Kwagga
 Letaba
 Levubu
 Loskop
 Louis Trichardt
 Mac Musina
 Mankweng
 Mogol
 Naboomspruit
 Noordelikes
 Northam Platinum
 Nylstroom
 Phagameng Rugby Club
 Phalaborwa
 Pietersburg
 Police
 Potgietersrus
 Seshego
 Thabazimbi
 Union
 University of Limpopo
 University of Venda
 Vaalwater
 Winterveldt

Updated 8 May 2014.

Boland Rugby Union

The club sides that form part of the Boland Rugby Union are:

 Abbotsdale
 Adelaars
 All Stars
 Ashton United
 Atlantics
 Attackers
 Aurora
 Bella Vista
 Black Leaves
 Blue Swallows
 Bonnievale United
 Botrivier
 Broodkraal
 Caledon
 Cederberg Leopards
 Ceres
 Cheetahs
 Citrusdal
 Coronations
 CPUT
 Darling
 De Doorns
 Delicious
 Delicious
 Dennegeur
 Die Dorings
 Doringbaai Young Spurs
 Eagles
 Elandsbaai
 Elandskloof
 Elim
 Evergreens Paarl
 Evergreens Wellington
 Excelcior
 Flying Eagles
 Flying Eagles
 Genadendal
 Goedverwacht
 Gold Stars
 Golden Eagles
 Golden Swallows
 Good Hopes
 Grabouw
 Green Lillies
 Greyton
 Growing Stars
 Hamlet
 Hawston
 Hillcrest United
 Hopefield
 Invincibles
 Kleinmond
 Klipdrift
 Koringberg
 Laingsburg
 Langebaan
 Malmesbury
 Mamre
 Marines
 Mbekweni United
 McGregor
 Miracles
 Montagu
 Môrester
 Mountain Stars
 Napier
 Never Despair
 Newtons
 Oak Valley
 Op-die-Berg
 Orchard
 Overhex
 Paardekloof
 Paternoster
 Piketberg
 Porseleinberg
 Porterville
 Protea De Doorns
 Protea Worcester
 Rangers Bredasdorp
 Rangers De Hoop
 Rangers Robertson
 Rawsonville United
 Red Roses
 Red Roses
 Red Stars 
 Riebeeck United
 Riviersonderend
 Robertson RFC
 Rooi Tiere
 Rooiberg United
 Rosendal
 Roses United
 Safcol
 Saldanha
 Saldanha Tigers
 Samoa Moorreesburg
 Saron
 Sea Hawks
 Spring Roses
 St Helenabaai
 Standards
 Struisbaai
 Temperance
 Thistles
 Titans
 Touwpark
 Tulbagh
 United Stars
 United Stones
 Universals
 Universals
 Velddrif
 Verenigde Ceres
 Villagers Breërivier
 Villagers Citrusdal
 Villagers Montagu
 Villagers Newton
 Villagers Wittewater
 Villagers Worcester
 Villiersdorp
 Voorberg
 Vredenburg
 Wamakers
 Wellington
 Wesbank
 Wolseley
 Worcester Perseverance
 Young Black Arrows
 Young Blues
 Young Blues
 Young Diggers
 Young Eagles
 Young Eagles
 Young Eagles Robertson
 Young Good Hopes
 Young Hamiltons
 Young Hearts
 Young Proteas
 Young Proteas 
 Young Stars
 Young Tigers
 Young Tigers
 Young Turbos
 Young Westlyans
 Zebras

Updated 8 May 2014.

Border Rugby Football Union

The club sides that recently played in the top-level domestic competition organized by the Border Rugby Football Union are:

 Africans
 Berlin Tigers
 Buffalo
 Breakers
 Black Eagles
 Busy Boys
 Cambridge
 East London Police
 Evergreen
 Moonlight
 Ngculu Zebras
 Ntlaza Lions
 Ncerha Leopards
 Ocean Sweepers
 Old Collegians
 Old Selbornians
 Ready Blues
 Shining Stars
 Swallows
 
 United Brothers
 Wallabies
 Winter Rose
 WSU All Blacks
 WSU Eagles
 Young Leopards

Updated 12 May 2014.

Eastern Province Rugby Union

The club sides that form part of the Eastern Province Rugby Union are:

 Aberdeen
 Adelaide Rangers
 African Bombers
 Alderonians
 All Blacks
 Auckland Tigers
 Black Lions
 Born Fighters
 Central
 Coldstream Crusaders
 Colesberg Wanderers
 Cookhouse United
 DB Blues
 Despatch
 Despatch Oostelikes
 Easterns
 Evergreens (Cradock)
 Evergreens (Krakeel)
 Excelsior
 Gardens
 Gelvan Wallabies
 Gladiators
 Glen Roses
 Grahamstown Brumbies
 Grootfontein
 Hamilton
 Hampshire
 Hankey Villagers
 Harlequins
 Hilltop Eagles
 Humansdorp RC
 Humansdorp United
 Jansenville
 Karoo Springbokke
 Khyelitsha United
 Kirkwood
 Klipfontein UT
 Kliplaat
 Kowie
 Kruisfontein
 Kuya
 Kuyga
 Kwaru
 Lily White
 Loerie Blues
 Middleberg Eagles
 Mighty Blues
 Mission
 Motherwell
 Murraysburg
 
 Noupoort Diamonds
 Old Grey
 Orlando Eagles
 Park
 Paterson Lions
 Pearston Villagers
 Pirates
 Port Elizabeth College
 Port Elizabeth Crusaders
 Port Elizabeth Harlequins
 Port Elizabeth Police
 Port Elizabeth Villagers
 Progress
 Red Lions
 Rhodes
 Rosebuds
 Scorpions
 Siyakhula
 Spring Rose
 St Cyprian's
 St Francis Sharks
 St Mark's
 Star of Hope
 Steytlerville Dolphins
 Steytlerville United
 Suburban
 Sunday Stars
 Thistles
 Trying Stars
 Union
 United Barbarians
 Visitors
 Walmer Wales
 Walmer Wallabies
 Wanders
 Windvogel United
 Winter Rose
 Winter Rose (UIT)

Updated 8 May 2014.

Free State Rugby Union

The club sides that form part of the Free State Rugby Union are:

 Bloemfontein Collegians
 Bloemfontein Crusaders
 Bloemfontein Defence Force
 Bloemfontein Police
 
 Mangaung
 Old Greys
 Steyners
 
 Warriors

Reserve teams also play in the league, as well as youth sides of CUT and UFS.

Updated 6 May 2015.

Golden Lions Rugby Union

The club sides that form part of the Golden Lions Rugby Union are:

 Alberton
 Alexandra
 Diggers
 Eldoronians
 Germiston Simmer
 Harlequins
 Jabulani
 Johannesburg Police
 Khosa
 Pirates
 Raiders
 Randfontein
 Roodepoort
 Soweto
 Titans
 
 Union
 Wanderers
 Wasps
 Wes Wits
 

Updated 8 May 2014.

Griffons Rugby Union

The club sides that recently played in the top two domestic competitions organised by the Griffons Rugby Union are:

 Beatrix
 Bethlehem Collegians
 Bethlehem Oud Skoliere
 Bobbies
 Bothaville
 Bultfontein
 Ficksburg
 Frankfort
 Harmony
 Harmony Tigers
 Henneman
 Kroonstad
 Harrismith
 Hoopstad
 Kestell
 Koppies
 Klutwanong
 Ladybrand
 Lindley
 Parys
 Welkom
 Welkom Rovers

Updated 12 May 2014.

Griqualand West Rugby Union

The club sides that form part of the Griqualand West Rugby Union are:

 Aggeneys RFC
 Desert Daisies Rugby Club
 Douglas RFC
 Elevations
 Gladiators RFC
 Hartswater Rugby Club
 Hope Town
 Hurricanes
 Jacobsdal
 Kakamas, Rugby Klub
 Kenhard
 Kenhardt, Rugby Klub
 Kimberley Polisie Rugby Club
 Klipfontein United Rugby Club
 Kuruman Rugby Club
 Marrigolds
 Nababeep Rugby Club
 Ocean Collegians Rugby Club
 Okiep Thistles R.F.C 
 Orania Rugby Club 
 Oranjemund RFC
 Phantoms Rugby Club
 Pofadder Rugby Klub
 Postmasburg
 Prieska Rugby Club
 Protea United
 Protea United Rugby Club
 Rangers RFC
 Riverton's
 Rosh-Pinah Rugby Club
 Sishen Rugby Club
 Springbok Rugby Klub
 Steinkopf United RFC
 Sutherland Rugby Club
 Tigers RFC
× Victoria Western Force
 United Rugby Football Club
 Universals
 Warrenton Rugby Club
 Warriors Rugby Football Club
 Young Blues Rugby Club
 Young Blues/Williston
 Young Lions
 Young Removers Rugby Club
 Young Stars Rugby Club

Updated 8 May 2014.

KwaZulu-Natal Rugby Union

The club sides that form part of the KwaZulu-Natal Rugby Union are:

 Amabhubesi
 Amangcesha
 Amanzimtoti
 Ballito Dolphins
 Bergville Zebras
 Black Knights RFC
 Bulls
 Cedara
 Clermont
 College Rovers
 Drakensberg
 Durban Collegians
 Durban Crusaders
 Durban Mets
 Eshowe
 Esikhawini
 Flying Eagles
 Gamalakhe
 Harding
 Harlequins
 Hillcrest Villagers
 Hluhluwe
 Howick Eagles
 Ixopo
 Izinyathi
 Jaguars
 Kapaailand
 Kokstad
 Kwantu
 Ladysmith
 Ladysmith United
 Mandini
 Mangosuto University of Technology
 Matatiele
 Melmoth
 Mtubatuba
 Nagle Dam Rhinos
 Newcastle Highlanders
 Newlands East Brumbies
 Noodsberg
 Obhejane
 Ogwini Bafana
 Pietermaritzburg Collegians
 Pietermaritzburg Waratahs
 Piet Retief
 Pinetown Raiders
 Pongola
 Queensburgh
 Rhinos
 Richards Bay
 Scottburgh
 Sentraal
 South Coast Warriors
 University of KwaZulu-Natal Howard College
 
 University of KwaZulu-Natal Westville
 University of Zululand
 Ushaka Warriors
 Utrecht
 Varsity College
 Volksrust
 Voortrekker Old Boys
 Vryheid
 Young Lions
 Westville Old Boys
 Zululand Rhinos

Updated 8 May 2014.

Leopards Rugby Football Union

The club sides that recently played in the top-level domestic competition organised by the Leopards Rugby Football Union (or teams from the region playing in other competitions) are:

 Hartbeesfontein
 Klerksdorp2
 Leeudoringstad
 Lichtenburg
 Matlosana Rugby Club
 1
 Potch Dorp
 Rustenburg Impala3
 Vaal Reefs2
 Vryburg

1  play club rugby in the Golden Lions Pirates Grand Challenge.2 Klerksdorp and Vaal Reefs play club rugby in the Valke Peregrine League.3 Rustenburg Impala play club rugby in the Blue Bulls Carlton League.

Mpumalanga Rugby Union

The club sides that recently played in the top-level domestic competition organised by the Mpumalanga Rugby Union are:

 Barberton
 Bethal
 Carolina
 Ermelo
 Groblersdal
 Impala Komatipoort
 Hurricanes
 Kriel
 Lydenburg Rooikatte
 Malelane
 Matla
 Middelburg
 Nelspruit
 Ratels
 Sasol
 Standerton
 Tigers
 White River
 Witbank Ferros

Updated 12 May 2014.

South Western Districts Rugby Football Union

The club sides that form part of the South Western Districts Rugby Football Union are:

 Adias
 Albertinia
 All Blacks
 Arrows
 Barrydale
 Beaufort
 Bitou
 Black Lions
 Black Warriors
 Blanco
 Bonnievale Blue Birds
 Bridgton
 Buffaloes
 Calitzdorp
 Collegians
 Crusaders
 DKD Mosselbaai
 DKD Oudtshoorn
 Dysselsdorp
 Eagle Stars
 Evergreens
 Excelciors
 Gamka United
 Garden Route
 George
 Glen Roses
 Greater Knysna
 Grootbrak
 Happy Hearts
 Harlequins
 Heidelberg
 Hungry Lions
 Jaguars
 Kango United
 Knysna United
 Ladismith
 Maoris
 Mossel Bay
 Mossel Bay Barbarians
 Mountain Stars
 NMMU George
 Oudtshoorn
 Perseverance
 Plett United
 Prince Albert
 Progress George
 Progress Suurbraak
 Proteas
 PSP Timbers
 Rheenendal
 Riversdal Barbarians
 Riversdal Dorp
 Riversdale Blues
 Seagulls
 Shamrocks
 Silverstars
 Spring Roses
 Super Stars
 Swellendam
 Swings
 Thistles
 Uniondale
 United Stars
 Van Wyksdorp
 Vleesbaai
 Willowmore
 Winter Roses
 Young Leaves
 Young Roses
 Zoar

Updated 6 May 2014.

Valke Rugby Union

The club sides that form part of the Valke Rugby Union are:

 Benoni
 Boksburg
 Brakpan
 Buffels
 Delmas
 East Rand Police
 East Rand United
 Edenpark
 Edenvale
 Elsburg
 Heidelberg
 Kempton Wolwe
 Meyerton
 Nigel
 
 Sasolburg
 Springs
 Vaal
 VUT
 Vereeniging

Updated 8 May 2014.

Western Province Rugby Union

The club sides that form part of the Western Province Rugby Union are:

 Albions
 All Saints
 Allandale
 Atlantis
 Belhar
 Bellville
 Bishop Lavis
 Blakes
 Blue Jets
 Blue Stars United
 Brackenfell
 Busy Bees
 Caledonian Roses
 Cities
 Cloetesville
 Collegians
 Delft United Rugby Club
 Durbanville-Bellville
 Eersterivier
 Elsies River United
 False Bay
 False Bay Cobras
 Franschhoek United
 Goodwood
 Goodwood Gazelles
 Hamediehs
 Hamiltons
 Hamlets
 Hands & Heart
 Helderberg
 Imiqhayi
 Khaya Rose
 Khayelitsha
 Koshuis
 Kraaifontein
 Kuilsrivier
 Kylemore
 Lagunya
 Langa
 Lower Paarl
 Macassar
 Manenberg Rangers
 Masiphumelele
 
 Mitchells Plain Utd
 Mountain Rocks
 NNK
 Noordelikes
 Paarl
 Paarl Rangers
 Peninsula
 Perel United
 Perseverance
 Pniel Villagers
 Polisie
 Primrose
 Progress
 Raithby Universals
 Rangers
 Retreat
 Richmond Rangers
 Riverstones
 Rocklands
 Scottsdene Central
 Silverleaf
 Silvertree
 Simondium
 Sir Lowrians
 SK Walmers
 St George's
 Stellenbosch Coronations
 Strand
 Strand Pioneers
 Strand United
 Technikon-tuine
 Temperance
 Thistles
 Titans
 Tygerberg
 
 Unimilrfc
 United brothers
 
 Van der Stel
 Vikings Police
 Villager
 Vineyards
 Violets
 Violets (Paarl)
 Watsonia
 Whistling Wheels
 Windmeul United
 Young Brothers
 Young Gardens
 Young Ideas
 Young Peoples
 Young Standards
 Young Stars
 Young Wesleys

Updated 8 May 2014.

See also

 Currie Cup
 Vodacom Cup
 Varsity Rugby
 Gold Cup

References

Teams